The Danish Animal Protection Act is a Danish law against animal cruelty.

As stated in § 1, the law protects animals' living conditions. The Danish Animal Protection Act provides regulations against animal cruelty. .

Maximum penalty 
If the animal is being treated irresponsibly, the owner will be punished with either a fine or imprisonment for up to 1 year.

See also 
 Animal welfare and rights in the Netherlands

References 

Law of Denmark